= The Historical Praise of Reason =

"The Historical Praise of Reason" (original French title: "Éloge historique de la Raison") is a panegyric in the form of a biography, written by the philosopher Voltaire in 1774.

== Synopsis ==
This fable in the form of a panegyric tells the story of the allegorical figure of Reason, who, after hiding in a well for years, finally emerges and realizes that her reign may have returned.
